Stolojan is a Romanian surname. Notable people with the surname include:

Anastase Stolojan (1836–1901), Romanian politician
Theodor Stolojan (born 1943), Romanian politician and economist
Stolojan I Cabinet, the Cabinet of the Government of Romania (1991, 1992)

Romanian-language surnames